Alan Hignett (born 1 November 1946) is an English former professional footballer who played as a full back in The Football League with Liverpool and Chester.

Playing career
Hignett progressed through the youth ranks with Liverpool, signing a professional contract in November 1963. He also represented England Schoolboys during his early years at the club.

His solitary first-team appearance for the Reds came in the final league game of the 1964–65 season, helping Liverpool to a 3–1 First Division victory at Wolverhampton Wanderers.

Hignett remained at Anfield the following season without adding to his appearance tally. In August 1966 he became the third Liverpool player – after John Bennett and John Sealey – to make a summer free transfer switch to Chester. He made his debut on 10 September 1966 in a 3–0 defeat by Crewe Alexandra and played in six successive games in the number three shirt. The last of these was a 3–1 loss to Wrexham on 8 October 1966.

This was to be his last professional appearance in England as Hignett moved to Australia and played football for several years in New South Wales.

External links
Liverpool FC player history profile
Article on players to play for Chester and Liverpool

References

1946 births
Living people
English footballers
English Football League players
Association football fullbacks
Liverpool F.C. players
Chester City F.C. players
Footballers from Liverpool